The Michigan Economic Development Corporation (MEDC) is a public-private partnership agency and economic development corporation dedicated to job creation in the U.S. state of Michigan.  Operating under the slogan "Pure Michigan", the MEDC attempts to encourage the tourism potential of the state and foster business relocations to Michigan.

The Michigan Economic Development Corporation is the successor-in-interest of the Michigan Jobs Commission, created in 1993.  The Commission was translated into the Development Corporation in 1999.  Its growth and operations during the following twenty years reflected the urgency of moving away from Michigan's perceived standing as a one-industry state dependent on fluctuating conditions in the motor vehicle industry.

See also
Educational inequality in Southeast Michigan

References

Economic Development Corporation
Economic Development Corporation
State departments of economic development in the United States
Economic Development Corporation